is a private university in the city of Inage-ku, Chiba, Chiba Prefecture, Japan, established in 1966. The predecessor of the school was founded in 1921. The university has attached junior college, high schools and kindergarten.

External links
 Official website 

Educational institutions established in 1921
Private universities and colleges in Japan
Universities and colleges in Chiba Prefecture
Buildings and structures in Chiba (city)
1921 establishments in Japan